Egoku Dōmyō (1632–1721) was an Ōbaku priest, ordained at the age of nine into the Rinzai sect. In 1650 he met Tao-che—the Abbot of Sofuku-ji—in Nagasaki, Japan and subsequently joined his temple. Later he joined the assembly at Mampuku-ji in 1663, following the death of Tao-che. There he trained under his master's teacher Yin-Yuan and his disciple, Mu-an. He was ordained an Obaku monk in 1665 at the temple, receiving inka from Mu-an—Mu-an's second Dharma transmission. He founded and/or restored some twelve temples after receiving inka, and in 1687 served as Abbot at Zuisho-ji. He made forty-two Dharma heirs during his life.

Notes

References

Obaku Buddhists
Zen Buddhist priests
Japanese Zen Buddhists
1632 births
1721 deaths